José Olguín (19 December 1926 – 4 May 1998) was a Mexican water polo player. He competed in the men's tournament at the 1952 Summer Olympics.

References

External links

1926 births
1998 deaths
Mexican male water polo players
Olympic water polo players of Mexico
Water polo players at the 1952 Summer Olympics
Place of birth missing
20th-century Mexican people